Stow (or archaically, Stow-in-Lindsey) is a village and civil parish within the West Lindsey district of Lincolnshire, England. The total resident population was 355 at the 2001 census, increasing to 365 (and including Thorpe in the Fallows) at the 2011 census.

The parish of Stow, which includes other localities such as Coates-by-Stow, is today a mixture of modern brick and older stone-built housing, some of the latter being thatched. The village has a public house, the Cross Keys, a Methodist chapel, and the remains of a large minster church.

There is another Stow in Lincolnshire, the site of a lost village and medieval fair, between Threekingham and Billingborough. The location is now known as Stow Green Hill. There is also  Shepeau Stow near Spalding.

History

Stow dates back to Roman times and in the Anglo-Saxon period was known as Sidnaceaster ("ceaster" meant fortification or camp). Its parish church, Stow Minster, is one of the oldest churches in Britain. As Sidnacestre, it is a titular see or bishopric in Roman Catholicism.

Stow means "Holy Place". There is evidence of Roman activity within the village, including the discovery of ancient coins, ruins and foundations from this period.

Around 1640, the rector's son, George Clifford, moved from Stow to Amsterdam. His grandson George Clifford III became the maecenas of Carl von Linné the Swedish botanist.

Governance
Lying within the historic county boundaries of Lincolnshire from a very early time, Stow lay within the Well hundred of the ancient Parts of Lindsey, having previously formed part of the ancient Anglo-Saxon Kingdom of Lindsey.

As a result of the 1834 Poor law Amendment, the parish of Stow became part of the Gainsborough Poor Law Union, and later, for civil registration matters, part of the Willingham sub-district of the Gainsborough Registration District. In 1974, as part of the provisions of the Local Government Act 1972, Stow was given to the newly created non-metropolitan district of West Lindsey, though remained within the county of Lincolnshire.

Stow Minster

There had been a church at Stow even before the arrival of the Danes in 870 – the year they are documented to have burnt the church down. The building remained in ruins until an abbey was built in 1040, reputedly by Bishop Eadnoth II. It is partly Saxon and partly Norman in date and is designated by English Heritage as a Scheduled Ancient Monument and was also included in the World Monuments Fund's 2006 list of the world's 100 most endangered sites. The arches in the Anglo-Saxon part are the tallest of their era in Britain.

A mile to the west of the village and lying just to the south of the Roman road known as Tillbridge Lane are the remains of the medieval palace of the Bishops of Lincoln built in 1336. All that can be seen today are the earthworks of the moat and to the north and east of the site the earthwork remains of its associated medieval fish-ponds.

Coates by Stow
There is no village here, just a farm with a farmyard and a church standing nearby.

The church, dedicated to St Edith, is late Norman 12th-century, but has alterations and additions up to Georgian periods, including a double bellcote, which can be seen in the photo at right. The church has a low and small nave and chancel. It contains a 15th-century rood screen, the only one in Lincolnshire. There is a Jacobean family pew at the west end, and the rest of the seating is just rough benches sometimes described as "rustic". There is the royal coat of arms of Charles I dating from 1635 and brasses to a William Butler (d.1590) and his wife; the figures on these are small. In a niche there is a demi-figure made of alabaster of a Brian Cooke who died in 1653. There are also small pieces of stained glass. Outside, just south of the chancel, is the tomb of the Maltby family comprising an urn on a table with tapering columns as legs, with a sarcophagus underneath.

There are earthworks in the hamlet, the site of the medieval village at Coates.

References

External links

Villages in Lincolnshire
Civil parishes in Lincolnshire
West Lindsey District